is a Japanese footballer who plays for Geylang International FC in Singapore. His regular playing position is a forward or a winger.

Career

Yokohama F. Marinos 
Yamaya signed for Yokohama F. Marinos ahead of the 2019 season. He made his first appearance for the Tricolore in a J.League Cup match against local rivals Shonan Bellmare on 13 March 2019. He started the match and was then substituted by Noah Kenshin Browne in the 82nd minute of a 2–0 defeat. A month later he played the full 90 minutes and scored the opening goal in a 2–2 draw at home to V-Varen Nagasaki. He was also on the scoresheet in his third appearance of the campaign, a 4–0 rout of Hokkaido Consadole Sapporo on 8 May 2019.

His first J.League appearance came as an 86th minute substitute for the Brazilian, Marcos Júnior in a 3–0 win away to Urawa Red Diamonds on 5 April 2019.

Geylang International FC 
On 12 January 2023, it was announced that Geylang International FC had completed the signing of Yamaya.

Career statistics

Last update: 28 Feb 2023

International Statistics

U15 International caps

U15 International caps

References

External links

2000 births
Living people
Association football people from Kanagawa Prefecture
Japanese footballers
J1 League players
Yokohama F. Marinos players
J2 League players
Mito HollyHock players
Kagoshima United FC players
Association football forwards